The 2011 MNL Grand Royal is the Myanmar National League's second full regular season.

League table
Below is the league table for 2011 season. Yangon United FC secured their
first ever championship in this season and have also become champions of 2011 Max Cement MFF Cup. This is the first time a team has win
both cup and championship in short MNL history.

See also
2011 in Burmese football

References

External links
Season on soccerway.com

Myanmar National League seasons
1
Myanmar
Myanmar